Vianos is a Spanish municipality situated in Albacete, inside Castile-La Mancha. It is situated around 89 kilometres away from the city of Albacete. According to INE, it has a population of 412 in 2010. 
It is integrated inside the natural park of "Los calares del río Mundo y de la Sima", being the municipality with the biggest area and having a great botanical variety.

Municipalities of the Province of Albacete